Shutup & Jam! is the fourteenth studio album by American rock musician Ted Nugent. It was released on July 7, 2014, in the United Kingdom and on July 8, 2014, in the United States. It features a guest appearance by Sammy Hagar on the song "She's Gone", and is Nugent's first studio album since 2007's Love Grenade.
The album was released on CD, red 12-inch vinyl, and as digital download. This is the last album to feature drummer Mick Brown.

Track listing 
"Shutup & Jam!"
"Fear Itself"
"Everything Matters"
"She's Gone" (feat. Sammy Hagar)
"Never Stop Believing"
"I Still Believe"
"I Love My BBQ"
"Throttledown"
"Do-Rags and a .45"
"Screaming Eagles"
"Semper Fi"
"Trample the Weak Hurdle the Dead"
"Never Stop Believing (Blues)"

Personnel 
Ted Nugent – lead guitar, six-string bass, vocals
Derek St. Holmes – rhythm guitar, backing vocals, lead vocals on "Everything Matters"
Greg Smith – bass
Mick Brown – drums on "Screaming Eagles", "Johnny B. Good Forever"
Johnny Bee Badanjek – drums on "She's Gone", "I Still Believe"
Jonathan Kutz – drums on "Shutup & Jam!", "Fear Itself", "Throttledown", "Trample the Weak", "Semper Fi", "Do-Rags and a .45", "Everything Matters", "I Love My BBQ", "Never Stop Believing", "Never Stop Believing (Blues)"
Sammy Hagar – vocals on "She's Gone"
Andy Patalan – engineering, mixing, mastering, backing vocals
Tim Patalan – engineering
Produced by Michael Lutz and Ted Nugent

References 

Ted Nugent albums
2014 albums
Frontiers Records albums